Schidonychus brasiliensis is a species of beetle in the family Carabidae, the only species in the genus Schidonychus.

References

Ctenodactylinae